Bulu Mukarung is a music composer and writer from the Nepali music industry.

References

External links
YouTube.com

Nepalese musicians